Lists of biologists by author abbreviation include lists of botanists and of zoologists. The abbreviations are typically used in articles on species described or named by the biologist.

Botanists

Zoologists
List of authors of names published under the ICZN

Lists of biology lists